"The Mangler" is a short story by Stephen King, first published in the December 1972 issue of Cavalier magazine, and later collected in King's 1978 collection Night Shift.

Setting
"The Mangler" is set in an American town, and the action largely takes place in an industrial laundry. Stephen King has stated that, among the many jobs he took to support his family before he became famous, he worked in an industrial laundry.

Plot summary
John Hunton, a police detective investigating a sudden rash of grisly deaths caused by an industrial laundry press called a mangle, discovers that a series of unfortunate coincidences involving the machine have inadvertently replicated a demon-summoning ritual. Due to various ingredients (including medicine containing extract of nightshade, a live bat, and the fresh blood of a virgin getting into the machine) being combined, the machine itself has become possessed by a demon. The story ends after the detective and his friend underestimate the demon's power, and in seeking to exorcise the machine, instead goad it into ripping free of its moorings and prowling the streets in search of fresh prey.

Adaptations 
This story was adapted for the screenplay of a 1995 film (directed by Tobe Hooper) of the same title, though the brevity of the source material required significant additions not present in the original tale. The film, starring Robert Englund (of Freddy Krueger fame), was followed by two sequels, The Mangler 2 and The Mangler Reborn. Both are alternating sequels to the first film.

See also
 Stephen King short fiction bibliography

References

External links

1972 short stories
Short stories by Stephen King
Fantasy short stories
Horror short stories
Works originally published in Cavalier (magazine)
Short stories adapted into films